The American Finance Association (AFA) is an academic organization whose focus is the study and promotion of knowledge of financial economics.  It was formed in 1939.  Its main publication, the Journal of Finance, was first published in 1946.


Mission 
The purpose of the association is to:
Act as a mutual association of persons with an interest in finance
Improve the public understanding of financial problems
Provide for the exchange of financial ideas through the distribution of the Journal of Finance and other media
Encourage the study of finance in colleges and universities
Conduct other activities appropriate for a non-profit, professional society in the field of finance

Membership 
As of 2022, the association has over 12,000 members.  A variety of membership options exist and membership is open to anyone.

A number of members are also distinguished in the Society of Fellows of the Association.  These are members who have made significant contributions to the field of finance.

Administration 
The administration of the association is overseen by both officers and a board of directors.  All of these positions are held by faculty at various universities. The board of directors rotates over time and assists in key decisions and policies.

Journal of Finance 
The Journal of Finance is an academic journal that covers the whole field of finance. It began publication in 1946. According to Journal Citation Reports, it has a 2015 impact factor of 5.290. The current editorial team is Stefan Nagel (editor), Philip Bond, Amit Seru, and Wei Xiong. The Journal of Finance, The Review of Financial Studies, and the Journal of Financial Economics are considered to be the top-three finance journals.

Annual meeting 

An annual meeting of the association is held every year in January, in conjunction with the American Economic Association and the North American Winter Meetings of the Econometric Society as a part of the Allied Social Science Associations.  The president speaks on a selected topic and there are presentations of various financial papers. The AFA, Western Finance Association Meetings, and Society for Financial Studies Cavalcade are considered to be the three top general finance conferences in the world.

Recent Annual Meeting AFA sites:
2015 Boston, Massachusetts
2016 San Francisco, California
2017 Chicago, Illinois
2018 Philadelphia, Pennsylvania
2019 Atlanta, Georgia
2020 San Diego, California
2021 Virtual Annual Meeting
2022 Virtual Annual Meeting

Past and current presidents of the AFA 

1940   Kenneth Field
1941   Chelcie C. Bosland
1942   Charles L. Prather
1943   John D. Clark
1944 No President
1945 No President
1946   Harry G. Guthman
1947   Lewis A. Froman
1948   Benjamin H. Beckhart
1949   Neil H. Jacoby
1950   Howard R. Bowen
1951   Raymond J. Saulnier
1952   Edward E. Edwards
1953   Roland I. Robinson
1954   Garfield V. Cox
1955   Norris O. Johnson
1956   Miller Upton
1957   Marshall D. Ketchum
1958   Lester V. Chandler
1959   James J. O'Leary
1960   Paul M. Van Arsdell
1961   Arthur M. Weimer
1962   Bion B. Howard
1963   George T. Conklin Jr.
1964   Roger F. Murray
1965   George Garvy
1966   J. Fred Weston
1967   Robert V. Roosa
1968   Harry C. Sauvain
1969   Walter E. Hoadley
1970   Lawrence S. Ritter
1971   Joseph A. Pechman
1972   Irwin Friend
1973   Sherman J. Maisel
1974   John Lintner
1975   Myron J. Gordon
1976   Merton H. Miller
1977   Alexander A. Robichek
1978   Burton G. Malkiel
1979   Edward J. Kane
1980   William F. Sharpe
1981   Franco Modigliani
1982   Harry M. Markowitz
1983   Stewart C. Myers
1984   James C. Van Horne
1985   Fischer Black
1986   Robert C. Merton
1987   Richard Roll
1988   Stephen A. Ross
1989   Michael J. Brennan
1990   Myron S. Scholes
1991   Robert H. Litzenberger
1992   Michael C. Jensen
1993   Mark Rubinstein
1994   Sanford J. Grossman
1995   Martin J. Gruber
1996   Eduardo S. Schwartz
1997   Hayne E. Leland
1998   Edwin J. Elton
1999   Hans R. Stoll
2000   Franklin Allen
2001   George M. Constantinides
2002   Maureen O'Hara
2003   Douglas W. Diamond
2004   René M. Stulz
2005   John Y. Campbell
2006   Richard C. Green
2007   Kenneth R. French
2008   Jeremy C. Stein
2009   J. Darrell Duffie
2010   John H. Cochrane
2011   Raghuram G. Rajan
2012   Sheridan Titman
2013   Robert Stambaugh
2014   Luigi G. Zingales
2015   Patrick Bolton
2016   Campbell Harvey
2017   David Scharfstein
2018 Peter DeMarzo
2019 David Hirshleifer
2020 Kenneth Singleton
2021 John Graham
2022 Laura Starks
2023 Markus Brunnermeier

Fellows of the American Finance Association 

In January 2000, the Board of Directors of the American Finance Association instituted a Society of Fellows of the Association. The purpose of the society is to recognize those members who have made a distinguished contribution to the field of finance.
Since Fellows are selected by the membership for their contributions to the field of finance, and since this is the principal criterion for election as president, all living past presidents and all future presidents of the association are designated as Fellows. The list of AFA Fellows contains all past presidents and the Fellows selected since that date.
Each year, the Nominating Committee, chaired by the current president, solicits names from the membership and nominates a slate of no more than five candidates from which current Fellows elect a maximum of two new Fellows. Polling of the current Fellows is carried out by the immediate past-president prior to the next annual meeting.

Prizes and awards

Fischer Black Prize 
Biennially, the association awards the Fischer Black Prize at its annual meeting.  The award, named in honor of economist Fischer Black, recognizes an outstanding young academic whose original research has made a significant contribution to the field of finance.

Brattle Prizes 
Annually, the Brattle Prizes are awarded annually for outstanding papers on corporate finance at its annual meeting.

Dimensional Fund Advisors Prizes 
Annually, the association awards the Dimensional Fund Advisors Prizes (prizes prior to 2019 were sponsored by Amundi Pioneer, Amundi Smith Breeden, and Smith Breeden) for the top three papers in the Journal of Finance in any area other than corporate finance at its annual meeting.

Morgan Stanley-AFA Award for Excellence in Finance 

The Morgan Stanley-American Finance Association Award for Excellence in Finance was a bi-annual finance award granted based on an individual's career achievements in outstanding thought leadership in the field of financial economics. The Award began in 2008 and continued for 5 bi-annual periods.

Notes

External links 
 American Finance Association
 Morgan Stanley AFA Award

Professional associations based in the United States
Business and finance professional associations
Economics societies
Learned societies of the United States
Organizations established in 1939
1939 establishments in the United States